Generalized essential telangiectasia (also known as "General essential telangiectasia") is characterized by the dilation of veins and capillaries over a large segment of the body without preceding or coexisting lesions, telengiectases that may be distributed over the entire body or be localized to some large area such as the legs, arms, or trunk.

See also 
 Skin lesion
 List of cutaneous conditions

References

External links 

Dermal and subcutaneous growths
Vascular-related cutaneous conditions